Caudofoveata is a small class within the phylum Mollusca, also known as Chaetodermomorpha. The class is often combined with Solenogastres and termed Aplacophora, but some studies have cast doubt on the monophyly of this group.

Anatomy 
Caudofoveata are small (1–30 mm), mainly deep sea molluscs. They are worm-like, lacking shells or distinct muscular feet; they instead have scales and calcareous spines called sclerites, for movement.

Ecology 

Caudofoveates live by burrowing through soft sediment, and feed by lying vertically in the sediment with just the mouthparts exposed and taking in passing organic detritus. During sexual reproduction, the female produces eggs which are fertilized and brooded, and then the larvae swim freely.

Diet 
Caudofoveates feed on foraminifera.

Taxonomy
Caudofoveata comprises the following families and genera:
 Chaetodermatidae
 Caudofoveatus
 Chaetoderma
 Falcidentidae
 Chaetoderma
 Falcidens
 Furcillidens
 Limifossoridae
 Limifossor
 Metachaetodermatidae
 Metachaetoderma
 Prochaetodermatidae
 Chevroderma
 Claviderma
 Lonchoderma
 Niteomica
 Prochaetoderma
 Spathoderma
 Scutopodidae
 Psilodens
 Scutopus
There are 15 genera, with about 150 known species.

References

Aplacophorans
Mollusc classes